Green Lake in Minnesota could refer to the following:
Green Lake (Chisago City, Minnesota) in Chisago City, Minnesota
Green Lake (Isanti County, Minnesota) in Isanti County, Minnesota
Green Lake (Kandiyohi County, Minnesota) in Kandiyohi County

Lakes of Minnesota